Jagdgeschwader 52 (JG 52) was a German World War II fighter Geschwader (wing) that exclusively used the Messerschmitt Bf 109 throughout the war. The unit originally formed near Munich in November 1938, then moved to a base near Stuttgart. JG 52 became the most successful fighter-Geschwader of the war, with a claimed total of more than 10,000 victories over enemy aircraft during World War II. It was the unit of the top three scoring flying aces of all time, Erich Hartmann, Gerhard Barkhorn and Günther Rall.

Formation
In 1935, the Ministry of Aviation designed an air force (Luftwaffe) of 2,370 active planes by April 1938, which would require the production of about 18,000 planes to cover attrition. When 1938 came, the Luftwaffe split its fighter groups into light "Jagdgeschwader" flying the Messerschmitt Bf 109, for home defense, and heavy fighter wings called Zerstörergeschwader flying the Messerschmitt Bf 110, for offensive operations, based on doctrine devised over the 1930s. Although the Luftwaffe simply could not meet its mandated pre-Munich Agreement size, five times its then current size, aircraft poured into the various Geschwader around the country.

After the Munich Agreement, aircraft flooded into JG 433 in spite of the unit not even having a dozen pilots. By December, it had an almost full complement of Bf 109Ds, but a severe freeze around Christmas 1938 rendered them all inoperable. Improving weather and incoming trainees in the first weeks of 1939 improved JG 433's situation. To train the new pilots was the task of Klein-Ellguth's Staffelkäpitane, Oberleutnants Wolfgang Ewald, Adolf Galland, and Alfons Klein. All three had been members of the Condor Legion during the Spanish Civil War. Klein was killed in a crash on 18 February 1939 and was replaced by Oberleutant Helmut Kühle, also a Condor Legion veteran, on 1 March 1939. Over the month of March, JG 433 received some new Bf 109Es and was transferred to a grass airfield at Böblingen, near Stuttgart. The Luftwaffe reorganized on 1 May 1939, introducing the "block" designations for air wings. Luftflotte 3 was assigned blocks 51–75 for its fighter units. I./JG 433 was redesignated I./JG 52, two places up from its previous designation.

Organizational structure

Jagdgeschwader 52 followed the standard Luftwaffe organization for a fighter wing (Jagdgeschwader). As a Geschwader, equivalent in function to a USAAF Wing or RAF Group, but with a permanent command structure, JG 52 was commanded by a Geschwaderkommodore, usually a Major, Oberstleutnant, or Oberst. The Geschwaderkommodore commanded three or four Gruppe, identified by Roman numeral and their unit number (e.g. I./JG 52, II./JG 52, and III./JG 52), and commanded by a Major or Hauptmann, designated the Gruppenkommandeur. The Gruppe then was divided into three or four Staffeln that were each commanded by a Staffelkapitän, usually a Hauptmann, Oberleutnant, or sometimes a Leutnant and ordered by Arabic numeral and abbreviated, for example as 5./JG 1 rather than 5 Staffel II. Gruppe, JG 1. In total, every Geschwader contained on average 124 planes. When the Luftwaffe reorganized in Summer 1939, there were Geschwader with only two Gruppen.

Stab./JG 52
The establishment of Stab./JG 52, the command group (Geschwaderstab), at Böblingen had been planned for the third week of August 1939, but was delayed by the invasion of Poland. Late September finally saw the formation and posting of Stab./JG 52.

I./JG 52

As JG 433, I. Gruppe flew D and E models of the Bf 109, and began transitioning to the F series while based in the Netherlands in mid and late 1941. I. Gruppe flew the Bf 109Fs for a year until moving to the G models while stationed at Bakhmut (then Artemivsk) and flew them for the rest of the war, though I./JG 52 also flew the Bf 109K in the last year of the war.

II./JG 52

Two Staffeln, JG 72 and 71, were raised in the last weeks of peacetime as stopgap formations with the intent of forming a second Gruppe for JG 52. The first was 11.(N)/Jagdgeschwader 72, activated on 15 July 1939 as a night fighter Staffel with Arado Ar 68Fs. It was commanded by Oberleutant August-Wilhelm Schumann and based at Böblingen with I./JG 52. When the latter formation moved bases on 26–29 August 1939, 11./JG 72 was equipped with its Bf 190Ds. On the same day, 1./Jagdgeschwader 71 was activated at Schleißheim with Avia B-534s, commanded by Oberleutant Heinz Schumann. Until officially merging into II./JG 52 in early October 1939, the two Staffeln appear to have continued using their designations while being referred to as "Jagdgruppe Schumann" or as 4. and 5./JG 52.

III./JG 52

The Gruppe was transferred out of JG 52 to I./JG 28, which was based at Pipera, Bucharest from October 1940 to 4 January 1941, at which point it resumed being III./JG 52.

As JG 28 and early III./JG 52, III. Gruppe flew the Bf 109E until being stationed in Bucharest, where they transitioned to the F model. III. Gruppe moved on to the G series, which the Gruppe used for the rest of the war, while stationed at Taganrog and Luhansk.

13./JG 52

The 13th Staffel of JG 52, made up entirely of Slovakian Luftwaffe personnel, was formed on 27 October 1941 in Piešťany, Slovakia and was disbanded in January 1944. As with the rest of JG 52, Staffel 13 only flew the Messerschmitt Bf 109. From its formation in October 1941, it flew the Bf 109E until transitioning to the F model at Krasnodar in January 1943. While being stationed at Kerch only a month later, they transitioned again to the G model series, which 13./JG 52 flew for the rest of the war.

15./JG 52

15./JG 52 was one of two Croatian air squadrons raised for the Luftwaffe. The Staffel flew the Bf 109E from their formation until July 1942, when they transitioned into the Bf 109G, flying it until the end of the war for Croatia.

Mobilization and Western Front
Jagdgeschwader 52 spent the summer of 1939 training and practicing bomber defense around Stuttgart and along the western German border. Because of deficiencies in the Luftwaffes support structure, this was accomplished by requisitioning civilian trucks.

JG 52's final pre-war deployment was to the island of Wangerooge, near Wilhelmshaven, to train in dogfighting. In mid-August 1939, it moved back to Böblingen in time for the mobilization of the Wehrmacht and prepared to defend Stuttgart and its factories from French bombers. As I./JG 52 left, its remaining Bf 190Ds were assigned to the newly-formed 11./(N)JG 72.

Sitzkrieg and Battle of France
54 hours into the invasion of Poland, France and the United Kingdom declared war on Germany on 3 September 1939, beginning the Second World War. The remainder of 1939 have been dubbed the "Phony War" or sitzkrieg, as German, French, and British ground forces idled and dug in. Air units, however, mounted local patrols and recon sorties as the weather permitted.

On 6 September 1939, 11./JG 72 scored JG 52's first kill, as well as the first German aerial victory on the Western front. A French , of the reconnaissance unit GAO 553, was spotted while the Staffel was patrolling south of Karlsruhe and intercepted. On 6 October, 2./JG 52 brought down a LeO 451 performing reconnaissance on Luftwaffe bases in the Ruhr. The shooting down of a Bristol Blenheim IV from No. 114 Squadron RAF, as it was performing reconnaissance of German defenses, a week later is attributed to 1./JG 52. In the first week of October, II./JG 52 was established from 1./JG 71 and 11./JG 72, as was Stab./JG 52, turning JG 52 into a Geschwader of three Gruppen commanded by Major Hubert Merhart von Bernegg. Stab./JG 52 and II./JG 52 transferred from Böblingen to Mannheim. On 8 November, II./JG 52 made its first two kills as a formation of JG 52: a French observation balloon near Karlsruhe and a Morane MS 406 near Bitche.

Over the rest of November 1939, the Luftwaffe reorganized its fighter units on the Westwall in preparation for the offensives of the next year. That same day, Hptm. Klein-Ellguth and his wingman Leutnant Christoph Geller were shot down by French fighters. Both survived, but Klein-Ellguth was too severely injured to return to service. JG 52 suffered its first fatality on 22 November when Unteroffizier Hans-Joachim Hellwig's plane suddenly went into a steep dive and crashed behind French lines while on a high-altitude patrol. Harsh winter weather brought aerial action to an end for the rest of 1939.

On 1 February 1940, II./JG 52 was moved to Speyer, then gave up men and material with I./JG 52 to form III./JG 52 late in the month. III./JG 52 trained at an airbase near Berlin for six weeks, then joined Stab./JG 52 at Sandhofen on 6 April 1940.

Eastern Front
During Operation Barbarossa, the unit operated on the southern and central sectors of the front. During 1941–1942, with the Luftwaffe constantly on the offensive against vast numbers of the ill-equipped and poorly trained Soviet Air Force, the experienced and well-equipped JG 52 fighter pilots claimed numerous aircraft shot down.

By early 1942, JG 52 and JG 3 provided the fighter support along the southern sector of the Eastern Front. On 14 June 1942, based at an airfield at Grakowo, located approximately halfway between Kharkov and Kupiansk, Hauptmann Helmut Bennemann claimed JG 52s 2,000 aerial victory.

The Caucasus and Stalingrad offensives

In mid-July 1942, the Gruppen commenced re-equipment with the new Bf 109 G Gustav, and the wing continued covering the armoured spearhead offensive deep into the Caucasus. I. Gruppe by this time had become a highly mobile 'fire brigade' formation, sent at short notice to areas where fighter cover was quickly and urgently required. Shuttling between areas ranging from the Kerch Peninsula on the Black Sea to the Moscow Front, I./JG 52 was in constant action.

Although JG 52 was not directly involved in the final stages of the Battle of Stalingrad, III./JG 52 was used during the push towards the Caucasian oil fields in the south during August–September 1942, and II./JG 52 supported the attempted break-through by the 4th Panzer Army in late 1942. During this time, the 4,000th victory mark was reached, on 10 December 1942. The first half of 1943 saw action centered around the Strait of Kerch and the Crimea. By mid March, II. and III. Gruppen had the task of protecting 17th Army's main line of retreat. On 20 April 1943, Hauptmann Günther Rall scored the Geschwader's 5,000th victory.

Battle of Kursk
I. and III./JG 52 moved into the Ukraine in July 1943 in preparation for the massive Kursk offensive. By this time, German pilots faced the new generation of advanced Soviet fighter aircraft (such as the Yak-9 or La-5 of the La-5FN version) and improved battlefield tactics on the part of Soviet pilots. An aerial victory claimed by Oberleutnant Paul-Heinrich Dähne on 7 July during Operation Citadel was counted as 800th aerial victory by I. Gruppe and the 6,000th of JG 52 overall.

Defence of the Reich

The withdrawal of JG 3 in August 1943 left JG 52 as the sole complete fighter wing on the Eastern Front. Constantly on the move, JG 52 now operated from makeshift and temporary airstrips close to the rapidly contracting frontline.

By November 1943, the loss of Kiev threatened the stability of the entire Southern sector front, the whole of JG 52 being brought together again to help bolster defences. By December 1943 JG 52 had reached 8,000 victories. Over the Uman region, III./JG 52 claimed 50 victories in 60 days. III./JG 52 became its most successful Gruppe, claiming its 3,500th victory on 21 March 1944. By the end of the month, III./JG 52 was based in Poland.

On 10 May 1944, the 9,000th claim was made, with the 10,000 mark passed on 2 September 1944 by Adolf Borchers. The last German troops left the Crimea in May 1944, II./JG 52 retiring from battle a week earlier. Artillery fire and constant air raids had caused steady aircraft losses. A retreat to Romania followed soon after. A new opponent appeared at this stage, with elements of the USAAF 15th Air Force bombing the Ploiești oil fields in Romania. During JG 52's six-week defense, some 15 US aircraft were shot down, but by this time, attrition had reduced II./JG 52 to just nine operational fighters.

With the Normandy invasion underway, JG 52 was weakened by the removal of three Staffeln for service in the West. New 2, 4 and 7 Staffeln would be activated later in the year, with each JG 52 Gruppen now expanded to four Staffeln.

III./JG 52 was now seconded to the Central front, attached to elements of JG 51. By the spring of 1945, I. and III./JG 52 were stationed within Czechoslovakia, with II./JG 52 based in Austria. Although the units surrendered to the American forces at the end of the war; most of the I. and III. Gruppe personnel were handed over to the Soviet Army.

Commanding officers

Kommodore

Gruppenkommandeure

I./JG 52

II./JG 52

III./JG 52

Knight's Cross recipients of JG 52
The following recipients of the Knight's Cross of the Iron Cross served with JG 52:

Heinrich-Wilhelm Ahnert
Herbert Bachnick
Gerhard Barkhorn (Oak Leaves and Swords)
Wilhelm Batz (Oak Leaves and Swords)
Friedrich Beckh
Helmut Bennemann
Hans-Joachim Birkner
Hubertus von Bonin
Adolf Borchers
Johannes Bunzek
Paul-Heinrich Dähne
Hans Dammers
Gustav Denk
Adolf Dickfeld (Oak Leaves)
Peter Düttmann
Heinz Ewald
Wolfgang Ewald
Otto Fönnekold
Wilhelm Freuwörth
Heinrich Füllgrabe
Adolf Glunz (Oak Leaves)
Hermann Graf (Oak Leaves, Swords and Diamonds)
Berthold Graßmuck
Karl Gratz
Alfred Grislawski (Oak Leaves)
Friedrich Haas
Josef Haiböck
Karl Hammerl
Erich Hartmann (Oak Leaves, Swords and Diamonds)
Gerhard Hoffmann
Dietrich Hrabak (Oak Leaves)
Herbert Ihlefeld (Oak Leaves and Swords)
Alfons Klein
Gerhard Köppen (Oak Leaves)
Berthold Korts
Walter Krupinski (Oak Leaves)
Karl-Heinz Leesmann
Helmut Lipfert (Oak Leaves)
Johann-Hermann Meier
Rudolf Miethig
Karl Munz
Willi Nemitz
Friedrich Obleser
Viktor Petermann
Werner Quast
Günther Rall (Oak Leaves and Swords)
Anton Resch
Rudolf Resch
Edmund Roßmann
Heinz Sachsenberg
Franz Schall
Heinz Schmidt (Oak Leaves)
Waldemar Semelka
Siegfried Simsch
Karl Steffen
Leopold Steinbatz (Oak Leaves and Swords)
Johannes Steinhoff (Oak Leaves and Swords)
Heinrich Sturm
Ernst Süß
Rudolf Trenkel
Friedrich Wachowiak
Hans Waldmann
Johannes Wiese (Oak Leaves)
Franz Woidich
Hermann Wolf
Walter Wolfrum
Josef Zwernemann (Oak Leaves)

Notes

References

Citations

Bibliography

Further reading
 Christer Bergström, Graf & Grislawski: A Pair of Aces. Eagle Editions, 2003. 
 Christer Bergström, Black Cross/Red Star: The Air War over the Eastern front. Vol. 1, Pacifica Military History, 2000. Vol. 2, Pacifica Military History & Classic Publications, 2001. Vol. 3, Eagle Editions, 2006.

External links
 

Jagdgeschwader 052
Military units and formations established in 1939
Military units and formations disestablished in 1945